Gustav Östling (17 December 1914 – 9 July 1989) was a Swedish long-distance runner. He competed in the marathon at the 1948 Summer Olympics and the 1952 Summer Olympics.

References

External links
 

1914 births
1989 deaths
Athletes (track and field) at the 1948 Summer Olympics
Athletes (track and field) at the 1952 Summer Olympics
Swedish male long-distance runners
Swedish male marathon runners
Olympic athletes of Sweden
People from Gävle
Sportspeople from Gävleborg County
20th-century Swedish people